Kazi Nazrul Islam (born 16 October 1978) is a retired Bangladeshi professional footballer who played as a defender. He played for the Bangladesh national team from 1999 to 2008 and captained the team on multiple occasions. Nazrul currently works as a fitness trainer for his former club Abahani Limited Dhaka.

Club career
Nazrul spent most of his career with Abahani Limited Dhaka. His first spell with club lasted for five years and after three years away, Nazrul rejoined Abahani in 2007. During his second spell, Nazrul was a mainstay in defence as the club won the Bangladesh Premier League for three years straight, from 2007 till 2010. Nazrul ended his career after the 2010–11 Bangladesh League season when Abahani finally lost the league title to Sheikh Jamal DC.

International career
Nazrul captained Bangladesh during the 2007 Nehru Cup. He initially retired from international football in 2007 after a fallout with national team head coach at the time, Syed Nayeemuddin. He returned to the team after Nayeemuddin left only to play for one more year.

Honours
 Abahani Limited Dhaka 
Dhaka Premier Division League: 2001
Bangladesh Premier League: 2007, 2008-09, 2009-10
Federation Cup: 2000, 2010
National Football Championship: 2000
Super Cup: 2011
 Brothers Union 
Dhaka Premier Division League: 2001
National Football Championship: 2004
 Mohammedan SC 
National Football Championship: 2005–06

Bangladesh
SAFF Championship: 2003
South Asian Games Gold medal: 1999

References

Living people
1978 births
People from Narayanganj District
Bangladeshi footballers
Bangladesh international footballers
Bangladesh Football Premier League players
Abahani Limited (Dhaka) players
Mohammedan SC (Dhaka) players
Brothers Union players
Association football defenders
South Asian Games gold medalists for Bangladesh
Asian Games competitors for Bangladesh
South Asian Games medalists in football